North Fort Lewis is a census-designated place located in Pierce County, Washington.  It is a part of Fort Lewis, which is a part of Joint Base Lewis-McChord.

Demographics
In 2010, it had a population of 2,699 inhabitants. 1,754 were male. 945 were female.

See also
 Fort Lewis

References

Census-designated places in Pierce County, Washington
Joint Base Lewis–McChord